"Have It All" is a song by Bethel Music and Brian Johnson and is Bethel Music's lead and only single from their eighth live album, Have It All (2016). The song also appeared on the album Bethel Music en Español (2019). The live version of "Have It All" was released for streaming on February 20, 2016, followed by the release of the studio version on May 6, 2016. The song was written by Brian Johnson, Bobby Strand, Lindsey Strand, Mia Fieldes, and Joel Taylor, with production being handled by Chris Greely and Bobby Strand.

Background
A live version of the song, recorded at Bethel Church in Redding, California, was released as the first single from Bethel Music's live LP, Have It All, on February 20, 2016 via the streaming service Spotify prior to the album's release. The album was released on March 11, 2016.

On May 6, 2016, the studio version of the song was released as a single in digital download and streaming formats. The song's studio version impacted Christian radio on May 13, 2016.

Writing and development
In an interview with Kevin Davis of NewReleaseToday, Brian Johnson said:

Critical reception
Mark Ryan of NewReleaseToday said "'Have It All' is new song of surrender. The sound of the congregation singing along with Brian Johnson draws you into the evening it was recorded. The subdued guitar and muted kick drum in the opening leave the listener with an ethereal sense of being. This is a song to be sung from your knees with hands raised in surrender." Cross Rhythmss Tony Cummings labeled it a "white flag anthem". Kevin Davis, also of New Release Today, stated "This song totally moves me in my personal worship time. The song is an ethereal vertical worship ballad in the style of We Will Not Be Shaken, sung with a stirring passion and filled with prayerful declarations. This is an incredible song for the Church. The theme of this song should be the heartbeat of every faithful Christian. You'll be raising your heart and hands in worship along with this great new song. I hear in Brian's vocals a sincere yearning for God and thankfulness in his heart for God's mercy and grace. I'm completely convicted by the strong lyrics and find immense comfort in this song."

Music video
The official music video of "Have It All" with Brian Johnson leading it in worship at Bethel Church was published on YouTube by Bethel Music on February 17, 2016, has been viewed over 790 thousand times as of August 2017.

The official lyric video of the song was published on March 11, 2016, on Bethel Music's YouTube channel and has garnered over 3 million views as of August 2017.

Release history

References

2016 singles
2016 songs
Bethel Music songs
Songs written by Mia Fieldes